Olivia Lukaszewicz (born 15 September 1988) is a former professional tennis player from Australia.

Biography
Lukaszewicz was born in Adelaide to Polish immigrant parents. She attended the Australian Institute of Sport on a scholarship and had a top 40 ranking in a promising junior career.

A right-handed player, Lukaszewicz received a wildcard into the singles main draw of the 2004 Australian Open, at the age of 15. She was ranked barely in the world's top 1000 at the time and was drawn up against the top seed Justine Henin-Hardenne in the first-round. The match, played on Rod Laver Arena, was over in 45 minutes, with the world number one winning 6–0, 6–0. She also exited in the opening round of the junior competition by the same scoreline, beaten by Shahar Pe'er. Henin-Hardenne's coach Carlos Rodríguez later criticised Australian Open officials for mismatch, questioning whether a wildcard should have been granted.

In addition to her Australian Open appearance in 2004, she was also a member of Australia's Fed Cup squad that year for a tie against Russia in Moscow. Having already been in Moscow as a hitting partner, she joined Alicia Molik, Samantha Stosur and Rennae Stubbs as the fourth team member after Nicole Pratt withdrew.

Following her career in tennis she studied nutrition and now works in Adelaide as a dietitian.

ITF Circuit finals

Doubles (0–2)

References

External links
 
 

1988 births
Living people
Australian female tennis players
Australian Institute of Sport tennis players
Dietitians
Tennis players from Adelaide
Australian people of Polish descent